Alexei Kovalev (born 1973) is a Russian professional ice hockey coach.

Alexei Kovalev may also refer to:
 Alexey Kovalev (journalist), a Russian journalist
 Alexei Kovalev (referee), a Russian football referee
 Oleksii Kovalov, a Ukrainian politician and victim of terrorist assassination